HD 165493 is double star in the southern constellation of Ara. As of 2011, the two components have an angular separation of 4″ along a position angle of 257°.

References

External links
 HR 6759
 CCDM J18085-4546
 Image HD 165493

Ara (constellation)
165493
Double stars
088859
B-type bright giants
6759
Durchmusterung objects